Farley is a former rural village in the City of Maitland in the Hunter Region of New South Wales, Australia. Early settler Captain Emanuel Hungerford arrived in New South Wales in 1828 before purchasing an established  property named Lochdon. Here he built a homestead he called Farley House, from which Farley takes its name, after his ancestral home of Farleigh Hungerford, Somerset. Farley is currently being redeveloped into a residential suburb of Maitland, with many new estates planned and land available from 400sqm. Farley is among the emerging western suburbs of Maitland including nearby Rutherford and Gillieston Heights across the wetlands. The Farley Wastewater Treatment Works is located in a rural area south of the village. Farley is bordered to the north by the Main North railway line. The Farley railway station served the area from 1860 until 1975.

References

Suburbs of Maitland, New South Wales